Centro Comercial El Paseo Tehuacan  is a shopping mall located in Tehuacán, Puebla. Located at Av.

External links 
Centro Comercial El Paseo Tehuacan
Cartelera Cinépolis de Tehuacán en el Paseo

References

Shopping malls in Mexico
Shopping malls established in 2006